Russula brunneonigra is a fungus in the family Russulaceae, found Eucalyptus forests in New South Wales.

It was first described in 2007 by Teresa Lebel and Jennifer Tonkin.

References

brunneonigra
Taxa named by Teresa Lebel